Rhys Curran (born 7 July 1989) is a France international rugby league footballer who plays as a  forward for the London Broncos in the Betfred Championship.

He previously played for Villeneuve in the Elite One Championship, and Toulouse Olympique in League 1 and the Championship.

Background
Curran was born Darlinghurst, New South Wales, Australia and grew up on the Central Coast of New South Wales.

He only started playing rugby league at the age of 16, but went through the youth systems at the Wests Tigers. He played for his local club, winning the under 19s competition with the Erina Eagles in 2007.

Career

Wests Tigers
Curran played in the Toyota Cup for the Wests Tigers and was elevated to the Tigers NRL squad in 2009, but did not feature in first grade. He featured extensively for Wests in the NSW Cup competition.

Villeneuve
He left Australia in 2012 and began his playing career in France at Villeneuve.

Toulouse Olympique
Curran joined Toulouse Olympique ahead of their entry into the English rugby league pyramid, joining the French club from the 2016 League 1 season. 

He spent four seasons with Toulouse, earning international honours while at the club in 2018.

London Broncos
He joined the London Broncos ahead of the 2020 RFL Championship season on a two year contract.

International
Curran gained international honours for France in 2018. He qualified under residency grounds, having lived in France for over three years. He earned three caps against Wales, Ireland and Scotland, scoring a try on debut against the Welsh.

Club statistics

References

External links
London Broncos profile
Toulouse Olympique profile
London snap up Toulouse star Rhys Curran
Rhys CURRAN signs for one more season
Rhys CURRAN continues his journey with the TO

1989 births
Living people
Australian rugby league players
France national rugby league team players
London Broncos players
Rugby league locks
Rugby league players from Sydney
Toulouse Olympique players
Villeneuve Leopards players